Route 287 or Highway 287 may refer to:

Brazil
 BR-287

Canada
Manitoba Provincial Road 287
 Quebec Route 287

Japan
 Japan National Route 287

United States
 Interstate 287
 U.S. Route 287
 Alabama State Route 287
 Arizona State Route 287
 Connecticut Route 287
 Georgia State Route 287 (former)
 Iowa Highway 287 (former)
Kentucky Route 287
 Maryland Route 287
 Minnesota State Highway 287
 Montana Highway 287
 New York State Route 287 (former)
 Ohio State Route 287
 Pennsylvania Route 287
 Tennessee State Route 287
 Texas State Highway 287 (former proposed)
 Texas State Highway Loop 287
 Farm to Market Road 287 (Texas)
 Utah State Route 287
 Virginia State Route 287